Venus is a twelve-story-high mural painting by Knox Martin on the south side of Bayview Correctional Facility at 19th Street and Eleventh Avenue in Manhattan, New York City. 

Venus was commissioned by Doris Freedman of CityWalls (later the Public Art Fund) in 1970. Knox Martin chose this wall for its unique location, next to Eleventh Avenue (West Side Highway), and visible from the Verrazano-Narrows Bridge, the Statue of Liberty, the New Jersey shore of the Hudson River, and the West Side Highway itself.

Venus was restored in 1998 with the support of the Public Art Fund. A new weather-resistant acrylic paint developed in collaboration with the artist and donated by Golden Artist Colors was used, which will last at least 75 years.

The prison is a facility of the New York State Department of Correctional Services.  The Department made this statement in 2001:

Marilyn Kushner of the Brooklyn Museum wrote:

Traditionally the goddess of love and fertility, Venus represents woman, erotic and supple, but it also conveys Knox Martin's love affair with New York. Venus is his love poem to the city where he has always lived, a place that is part of his being. The feminine, curvilinear shapes of the image are in direct contrast with the straight forms that intersect the composition. The overwhelming size of this enormous mural only intensifies the experience of female shapes, the linear aspects of the painted composition, and of the surrounding architecture. In an era when art was reaching out to the masses with pop culture, this huge mural was Knox Martin's way of touching a public that would never venture into an art gallery.

Today, Venus is almost entirely obscured by the neighboring building 100 Eleventh Avenue, completed in 2010.

References

Further reading 
 "After a 37-Year Run, a Roadside Venus to Be Veiled" by Alex Mindlin, February 11, 2007, The New York Times 
 p. 12–13, Mural Paints: Current and Future Formulations by Mark Golden, 2003, The Getty Conservation Institute 
"Bayview's 10-Story Mural 'Venus' Gets a Facelift", Docs Today (July 1998).

External links
Knox Martin Website
Public Art Fund: Venus
Knox Martin 1971 WNYC Radio interview about Venus with Doris Freedman of City Walls
Art in Public Places, 1973 | From the Vaults | Metropolitan Museum of Art
CBS Report on the Mural

Murals in New York City
Public art in the United States
Chelsea, Manhattan
Eleventh Avenue (Manhattan)
1970 paintings